Eugenio Minasso (11 June 1959 – 6 December 2021) was an Italian politician.

Biography
A member of The People of Freedom, he served in the Chamber of Deputies from 2008 to 2013.

Minasso died from COVID-19 in Genoa on 6 December 2021, at the age of 62.

References

1959 births
2021 deaths
People from Sanremo
Deputies of Legislature XVI of Italy
The People of Freedom politicians
Deaths from the COVID-19 pandemic in Liguria